OGLE-2018-BLG-0799Lb is a sub-Saturn-mass exoplanet discovered in May 2018 by the Optical Gravitational Lensing Experiment (OGLE) collaboration.

It has a mass of 0.22 Jupiter masses and is 14,400 light years away from earth. It orbits a dwarf star of approximately 0.08 solar masses.

References

Exoplanets discovered in 2018
Exoplanets detected by microlensing